Floyd Anthony Streete (born 5 May 1959) is an English former professional footballer who played as a central defender.

Career
Streete played in the Football League for Cambridge United, Derby County, Wolverhampton Wanderers and Reading, making a total of 357 appearances for all four clubs. Streete also played in the Netherlands for Utrecht and Cambuur, before finishing his career in non-league football for Leighton Town.

He is perhaps best remembered for his career at Wolves, joining the Black Country club from Derby County in October 1985 for £5,000. Derby would win promotion from the Third Division that season while Wolves suffered relegation, but he played a key role in their turnaround in fortunes which followed over the next few years. He helped them win successive promotions as Fourth Division champions in 1988 and Third Division champions a year later, also winning the Football League Trophy in the first promotion season. He helped Wolves achieve a top half finish in the Second Division for the 1989–90 season before dropping down a division and signing for Reading in July 1990.

After football
After retiring as a player Streete worked as a PE teacher, before moving to the Cayman Islands to open a gymnasium and teach football.

His son Remie Streete was also a professional footballer who played for Port Vale. Another son Cameron Streete played for Swedish club Djurgårdens IF U19.

References

1959 births
Living people
Association football central defenders
English footballers
English expatriate footballers
Cambridge United F.C. players
Derby County F.C. players
Wolverhampton Wanderers F.C. players
Reading F.C. players
Leighton Town F.C. players
FC Utrecht players
SC Cambuur players
English Football League players
Eredivisie players
Eerste Divisie players
Jamaican emigrants to the United Kingdom
Expatriate footballers in the Netherlands
English expatriate sportspeople in the Netherlands
English people of Jamaican descent